The 2002 Chinese Jia-A League season is the ninth season of professional association football and the 41st top-tier overall league season in China. The league started on March 9 and ended on November 30, 2002 with Dalian Shide winning the championship, while to help the Chinese national team prepare for the 2002 FIFA World Cup there was no relegation within the league for the season.

Promotion and relegation
Teams promoted from 2001 Jia-B League
Shanghai Zhongyuan Huili

Teams relegated to 2002 Jia-B League
None

Overview
Before the league started it was dogged by rumours of match fixing when it was discovered that second tier club and promotion hopeful Changchun Yatai had fixed a match on October 6, 2001 against Zhejiang in their favour. When these allegations turned out to be true Changchun Yatai were denied promotion into the league as their punishment, which meant there would only be 15 teams performing within the league. Also before the season started it was decided that because the Chinese national team had qualified for the 2002 FIFA World Cup there would be no relegation so the players would not be distracted with the fear of demotion. Within the season Dalian Shide would continue their dominance within Chinese football and win their third consecutive league championship.

League standings

Top scorers

See also
Chinese Jia-A League
Chinese Super League
Chinese Football Association Jia League
Chinese Football Association Yi League
Chinese FA Cup
Chinese Football Association
Football in China
List of football records in China
Chinese clubs in the AFC Champions League

References

External links
China - List of final tables (RSSSF)

Chinese Jia-A League seasons
1
China
China
2002 establishments in China